Norman Childers "Hackenschmidt" Clark (12 November 1878 – 26 December 1943) was an Australian rules footballer who played for the Carlton Football Club in the Victorian Football League (VFL) between 1905 and 1912.

Family
The son of Edward John Clark, and Margaret Clark, née Cooper, Norman Childers Clark was born on 12 November 1878. He married Eileen Florence Fleming (1888–1983) on 11 June 1918. They had two children:  Norman Adrian Clark (1919–1998), and Bryan Childers Clark (1923–2003).

Football
Prior to joining Carlton, he had played in two premiership teams at North Adelaide.

A talented sprinter, in 1899 he won the 130-yard Stawell Gift in eleven and four-fifths seconds, off a handicap of 14 and a half yards. His prize of 50 gold sovereigns was used to buy a handmade gold pocket watch, in which he had his initials 'N.C.C' inscribed. He moved to Stawell, hoping to win another Gift, and he played two seasons with Stawell Football Club.

Upon his arrival at Carlton in 1905, his team-mates noticed his exceptional physique and nicknamed him "Hackenschmidt" after the famous strongman and professional wrestler, Georg Hackenschmidt.

He played in three consecutive premiership sides for Carlton from 1906–1908 as well as coaching Carlton to back-to-back premierships in 1914–15. He was with Charlie Hammond the only 2 people involved in Carlton's first five VFL flags.

After leaving Carlton at the end of the 1918 season he took up the head coaching role at Richmond. In his first season, he took the Tigers to the Grand Final. This attained him the rare feat of coaching two separate clubs in VFL Grand Finals.

Clark was also the coach of VFL sides St Kilda in 1925–26 and North Melbourne in 1931. He was captain-coach of Victorian Football Association (VFA) side Brighton in 1913. He coached junior and senior football for seventeen seasons in the VFA, the VFL and the Ringwood Districts Football Association, with four more premierships to his credit by the time he retired after the 1931 season.

Death
Clark died on Boxing Day in 1943.

Footnotes

References 
 Hogan P: The Tigers Of Old, Richmond FC, Melbourne 1996
 De Bolto, Anthony, "Carlton Legend Certificate Surfaces", blueseum,com, 2 January 2007.

External links

 
 Blueseum Biography: Norman Clark
 Blueseum Article: Norman Clark 20/01/2006
 MCC Article Excerpt Carlton vs. Richmond 14/08/2010
 Boyles Football Photos: Norman Clark.

1878 births
1943 deaths
Australian rules footballers from South Australia
Stawell Gift winners
North Adelaide Football Club players
Carlton Football Club players
Carlton Football Club Premiership players
Carlton Football Club coaches
Carlton Football Club Premiership coaches
Richmond Football Club coaches
St Kilda Football Club coaches
North Melbourne Football Club coaches
Prahran Football Club coaches
Brighton Football Club coaches
Stawell Football Club players
Brighton Football Club players
Three-time VFL/AFL Premiership players
Two-time VFL/AFL Premiership coaches